Buggytown is an unincorporated community located in Madison County, Kentucky, United States. It was also called Buckettown and Buggtown. It is located on Kentucky Route 595 northwest of Berea.

References

Unincorporated communities in Madison County, Kentucky
Unincorporated communities in Kentucky